The Exalted Flapper is a 1929 American comedy film directed by James Tinling and written by H. H. Caldwell, Ray Harris and Matt Taylor. The film stars Sue Carol, Barry Norton, Irene Rich, Albert Conti, Sylvia Field and Stuart Erwin. The film was released on June 9, 1929, by Fox Film Corporation.

Cast      
Sue Carol as Princess Izola
Barry Norton as Prince Boris of Dacia
Irene Rich as Queen Charlotte of Capra
Albert Conti as King Alexander of Capra
Sylvia Field as Marjorie
Stuart Erwin as Bimbo Mehaffey
Lawrence Grant as Premier Vadisco of Dacia
Charles Clary as Dr. Nicholas
Michael Visaroff as Old Fritz

References

External links
 

1929 films
1920s English-language films
Silent American comedy films
1929 comedy films
Fox Film films
Films directed by James Tinling
American black-and-white films
1920s American films